Field hockey in India refers to two teams, the India men's national field hockey team and the India women's national field hockey team.

In July 2018, Indian state Odisha wrote a letter to Prime Minister Narendra Modi urging him to declare field hockey as the national sport of India. The state government of Odisha has been supporting India's national field hockey team from February 2018 till next five years. The 2018 Men's Hockey World Cup was held in the Odisha capital Bhubaneswar between 28 November and 16 December and culminated with Belgium as World Champions defeating Netherlands in the finals. Field hockey was believed to be India's National sport but this was debunked by the Ministry of Youth Affairs and Sports, which confirmed that it had not declared any sport or game as the national sport.

Management

New Committee (IOA)
The Indian Olympic Association appointed a new five-member national selection committee. This panel will work in conjunction with the International Hockey Federation in managing field hockey in India.
The panel was headed by Aslam Sher Khan, a former MP and former hockey captain and includes Ashok Kumar, Ajit Pal Singh, Zafar Iqbal and Dhanraj Pillay. Aslam Sher Khan has now been replaced by Ajit Pal Singh as the chairman of the national selection committee. Aslam Sher Khan was highly displeased by this decision, though he remained as a selector.

On 30 April 2008, in an interview with India Today, Khan indicated the impact of the 2007 film about the National Women's Hockey Team, Chak De India, on his future strategy by stating that he wants "to create a 'Chak De' effect" within Indian hockey.

National teams

National men's team

The Indian Hockey Team is the national men's hockey team of India. It was the first non-European team to be a part of the International Hockey Federation. In 1928, the team won its first Olympic gold medal. From 1928 to 1956, was the golden period for the Indian Hockey team. The Indian men's team remained unbeaten in the Olympics, gaining six gold medals in a row. The Indian team has won a total of eight gold, one silver and three bronze medals in Olympics.

On 9 March 2008, India lost 2–0 to Britain at Santiago, Chile in the final of one of the three qualifying tournaments for the Beijing Olympics. With only the winner advancing to the 12-team event, the Indian men's team was eliminated from the Beijing Olympics competition. This is the first time that the Indian men's team did not participate in the Olympics since 1928. India finished in 12th place (Last) in the 2012 London Olympics.

On 26 Feb 2012, the India men's national field hockey team qualified for the 2012 Summer Olympics in London after a gap of 8 years. The team had a resounding victory over France in the finals of the Olympic qualifiers by beating France by 8–1. Ace drag-flicker Sandeep Singh, starred in the final against France by scoring five goals – including a hat-trick – all from penalty corners (19th, 26th, 38th, 49th and 51st).

Indian Men's Team Finished in 9th place in World Cup 2014 held in The Hague, Netherlands. Indian team won silver medal at the Commonwealth Games 2014, Glasgow. They lost to Australia 4–0 in the Finals. India hosted the 2018 World Cup. India won 2014 Asian Games Gold Medal after 16 years (last won in 1998). India won Asia Cup held in Dhaka in 2017.

Indian Men's hockey team won by a record 26-0 margin against Hong Kong in the 2018 Asian Games pool games. The earlier record was 24-1 made 86 years ago in the 1932 Olympics when India outclassed the USA.

World ranking

National women's team

The Indian Women's Hockey Team (nicknamed the Nabhvarna) is the national women's team representing hockey in India. It is the national women's team that represents India in international field hockey competitions. The team is currently coached by Netherlands' Sjoerd Marinje  and led by forward Rani Rampal from Haryana and is currently ranked 9th in the FIH World Rankings. Captain Suraj Lata Devi led the team to the Gold for three consecutive years: during the 2002 Commonwealth Games (the event which inspired the 2007 Shah Rukh Khan film, Chak De India), the 2003 Afro-Asian Games, and the 2004 Hockey Asia Cup. They were referred to as the "Jassi (Jasjeet) jaisi koi nahi"  or "Golden girls of hockey," after winning the 2004 Hockey Asia Cup.

During the summer of 2015, the team hosted the Round 2 of the 2014–15 Women's FIH Hockey World League and finished on top to qualify for the next stage. At the World League Semifinals held in Antwerp the team finished in the fifth place beating higher ranked Japan in classification match. The Indian woman's national field hockey team has thus qualified for the 2016 Summer Olympics for the first time since the 1980 Summer Olympics.

World ranking

State teams and events

Odisha

 
The Odisha Hockey Team is one of the regional hockey team from Indian state of Odisha. Lazarus Barla, Prabodh Tirkey, Dilip Tirkey, Ignace Tirkey, Jyoti Sunita Kullu, Lazarus Barla, Subhadra Pradhan, Birendra Lakra and Anupa Barla have been part of Indian hockey team in International level. 
Premier Hockey League (PHL) is league competition for field Hockey clubs in the top division of the Indian hockey system. There are seven teams in the PHL and Orissa Steelers is the only team from Eastern India. Orissa Steelers has won the Premier Hockey League in 2007. The 2014 Men's Hockey Champions Trophy was held in Kalinga Stadium, Bhubaneswar. The 2018 Men's Hockey World Cup is going to be held in the state capital Bhubaneswar.

Field Hockey Arenas in Odisha 
 Biju Patnaik Hockey Stadium - Rourkela
 Birsa Munda Intl Hockey Stadium - Rourkela
 Kalinga Stadium - Bhubaneswar

National tournaments 
All India MCC Murugappa Gold Cup Hockey Tournament, Chennai [T.N.]
All India Gurmeet Memorial Hockey Tournament, Chandigarh [Punjab]
Surjit Memorial Hockey Tournament, Jalandhar [Punjab]
All India Chhatrapati Shivaji Hockey Tournament, Delhi
All India Agha Khan Hockey Tournament, Mumbai [Maharashtra]
All India Bombay Gold Cup Hockey Tournament, Mumbai [Maharashtra]
All India Obaidullah Khan Gold Cup Hockey Tournament, Bhopal [M.P.]
All India Senior Nehru Hockey Tournament, Delhi
All India Lal Bahadur Shastri Hockey Tournament, Delhi
All India Sanjay Hockey Tournament, Delhi
All India K D singh Babu Memorial Invitational Prize Money Hockey Tournament, Lucknow [U.P.]
All India Ramesh Chander Memorial Hockey Tournament, Jalandhar [Punjab]
All India Liberals Hockey Tournament, Nabha
All India Shri Shadilal Rajendra Lal Memorial Hockey Tournament, Shamli [U.P.]
All India Indira Gold Cup Hockey Tournament, Jammu [J & K]
All India Beighton Cup Hockey Tournament, Kolkata [W.B.]
All India Lakshmi Ammal Memorial Hockey Tournament, Kovilpatti [T.N.]
Senior National Hockey Tournament
Junior National Hockey Tournament
Sub-junior National Hockey Tournament
Amarjeet Singh Bola Memorial Hockey Tournament Chakdana, Nawanshahr, Punjab
Bundel Khand All India Hockey Tournament, Charkhari Mahoba (U.P.) 
Republic All India Hockey Tournament, Katni, M.P.
All India Hockey Tournament, Damoh, M.P.
All India Hockey Tournament, Indore, M.P.
All India Hockey Tournament, Mhow, M.P.
All India Hockey Tournament, Ujjain, M.P.
All India Hockey Tournament, Tikamgarh, M.P.
All India Hockey Tournament, Ratlam, M.P.
All India Hockey Tournament, Khargon, M.P.
All India Hockey Tournament, Hoshangabad, M.P.
All India Hockey Tournament, Balaghat, M.P.
Bhagat Singh All India Hockey Tournament, Gwalior, M.P.
 Kodava Hockey Festival
  Dr. B.R.Ambedkar All India Hockey Tournament (under-16 Boys), Nagpur
Mahanth Raja Sarweshwer Das memorial All India Hockey Tournament, Rajnandgaon, C.G.

Premier Hockey League

The Indian Hockey Federation also conducts the Premier Hockey League (PHL), a domestic field hockey tournament in India since 2005, with active support from sports news channel ESPN India. The tournament was initiated to revive interest in the sport which was losing spectator interest to cricket in recent times. This is now replaced by World Series Hockey.

World Series Hockey

World Series Hockey is a proposed domestic hockey league in India. Though the name is given as World Series this competition does not deal with national teams of any nation. This tournament has clubs from eight Indian cities which will participate in the first season in 2011–12. This tournament will have 200 players from all around the world along with Indian players. Hence the name is given as World Series Hockey. This tournament replaces the old tournament of Premier Hockey League.

Hockey India League

After the success of World Series Hockey by Indian Hockey Federation, Hockey India have decided to start their own league for field hockey in India. Three out of six franchises have signed this league. They are, the Lucknow franchise by Sahara India Pariwar, the Punjab franchise from Mohali signed by Jaypee Group and Ranchi franchise by Patel-Uniexel Group. The broadcast rights are given to ESPN Star Sports (ESS). The first tournament is expected to be played in January 2013.

See also

List of Indian hockey captains in Olympics

References

Further reading
 (Published online: "Routledge Contemporary South Asia"; 1 July 2010).

External links
Hockey India Official Website
Everything About Indian Hockey
Indian Field Hockey Website
Indian Hockey Website
FIH's warning forced IOA to act: Ashok Kumar
Bhartiya Hockey Website
India's road to London Olympics: Six matches, six wins and a billion smiles

 
Sport in India